The Los Angeles Gladiators are an American professional Overwatch esports team based in Los Angeles, California. The Gladiators compete in the Overwatch League (OWL) as a member of the league's West region. Founded in 2017, the Los Angeles Gladiators are one of twelve founding members of the OWL and are one of two professional Overwatch teams based in Los Angeles (the other, the Los Angeles Valiant). The team is owned by Stan Kroenke and Josh Kroenke of Kroenke Sports & Entertainment, who also owns Gladiators Legion, an academy team for Los Angeles that competed in Overwatch Contenders.

The Gladiators have made a season playoffs appearance in every season. They claimed their first midseason tournament title in 2021, after winning the 2021 Countdown Cup. In 2022, they won two more midseason tournament titles, the regional Kickoff Clash and global Midseason Madness.

Franchise history

Team creation: Joining the Overwatch League 
On August 10, 2017, Blizzard officially announced that KSE Esports, owned by Stan Kroenke and Josh Kroenke, had acquired the second Los Angeles-based Overwatch League franchise spot. On November 2, as the twelfth and final franchise to unveil their branding, the team revealed the franchise would be called the Los Angeles Gladiators, as well as formally announcing they had partnered with Rob Moore Phoenix1 (later renamed to Sentinels after the partnership) to help manage the operations of the team. During the same announcement, they unveiled their initial seven-player inaugural season roster, consisting of a mix of nationalities, as well as their head coach David "Dpei" Pei.

Early years: 2018–present 
Los Angeles' first OWL regular season match was on January 10, 2018, and resulted in a 4–0 sweep over the Shanghai Dragons. The Gladiators went 10–10 through the first half of the season, prompting them to make roster changes, including the acquisition of tank players Baek "Fissure" Chan-hyung from the London Spitfire in February and Kang "Void" Jun-woo from Contenders team KongDoo Panthera in March. Los Angeles reached the playoffs in Stage 3, where they lost to the Boston Uprising, 0–3, in the first round. The team thrived in the final stage of the season. Behind MVP runner up Fissure, the Gladiators finished Stage 4 with a league-best 9–1 record. The team unexpectedly chose the second-seeded Valiant as their fist opponents in the Stage 4 playoffs; the Valiant subsequently defeated the Gladiators by a score of 3–2. With a 25–15 regular season record, the Gladiators claimed the fourth seed in the season playoffs. In their first playoff series, the Gladiators faced the Spitfire. The team elected to bench Fissure in favor of Luis "iRemiix" Galarza Figueroa throughout the best-of-three series; although the organization stated that the reason for the change was because Fissure's playstyle was not "right" for the current state of the game, journalist Rod "Slasher" Breslau reported that Fissure was "unhappy with the players on the team not trying hard enough... and stopped communicating in scrims." In the series, Los Angeles won the first match, 3–0. However, they lost in the following two matches, despite leading 2–0 to start both of them, ending their playoff run.

In the offseason preceding the 2019 season, the Gladiators made several roster changes, including transferring Fissure to the Seoul Dynasty. The team made two core pickups, signing Gee "Roar" Chang-hoon as Fissure's replacement and touted rookie damage player Jang "Decay" Gui-un to play alongside existing damage players Lane "Surefour" Roberts and João Pedro "Hydration" Goes Telles. Outside of a six-game winning streak in Stage 2, the team found middling results throughout the season, finishing with a 17–11 overall record and the fifth seed in the season playoffs. The Gladiators' first playoff match in the double-elimination tournament was against the Hangzhou Spark on September 5; they defeated the Spark, 4–3, marking the team's first ever playoff series win, including stage playoffs, in franchise history. The win advanced the team to the first round in the upper bracket, but they lost to the Vancouver Titans, 2–4, sending them to the lower bracket. Los Angeles' season came to an end after the following match, when they were swept 0–4 by the San Francisco Shock.

In the preceding offseason of the 2020 season, controversy arose among Kroenke Sports & Entertainment (KSE) and their partnered management organization Sentinels. Sentinels CEO Rob Moore filed suit against KSE, alleging that KSE executive Josh Kroenke had violated a verbal joint venture agreement between the two sides. In the aftermath from the lawsuit, it was announced that KSE and Sentinels would part ways, and KSE would officially take over management of the Gladiators on October 1, 2019. KSE would build up their own esports front office to manage both the Gladiators and a Los Angeles-based franchise in the Call of Duty League, which was later revealed as the Los Angeles Guerrillas.

The Gladiators parted ways with all but two of their players from the 2019 season, retaining only tank Benjamin "BigGoose" Isohanni and support Jonas "Shaz" Suovaara; among the many acquisitions of the offseason were veterans tank Indy "Space" Halpern, tank Son "OGE" Min-seok, and damage player Kim "Birdring" Ji-hyeok. The Gladiators finished their 2020 season with 11 wins and 10 losses to claim the sixth seed in the North America region. On September 4, Los Angeles advanced to the season playoffs after a 3–2 win over the Toronto Defiant in the North American play-in tournament. In the first round of the North American playoffs, the Gladiators were swept by the Philadelphia Fusion, sending them to the lower bracket. They lost to the Florida Mayhem in the first round of the lower bracket, which eliminated them from the playoffs.

In the 2021 offseason, the Gladiators made several roster changes, including the departure of BigGoose and Shaz, who had been with the team since their inauguration, and the signing of support player Grant "Moth" Espe, who was coming off of back-to-back OWL championships with the San Francisco Shock. The team failed to reach any of the first three midseason tournament interregional tournaments, despite promising showings in some of the qualifiers. However, in the fourth, and final, midseason tournament, the Countdown Cup, the Gladiators defeated the Chengdu Hunters in the finals by a score of 4–3. The win gave Los Angeles their first midseason tournament title in franchise history. With an 11–5 regular season record, the Gladiators finished in second place in the Western region standings, qualifying them for the season playoffs. While the team defeated the Philadelphia Fusion in the first round of the double-elimination tournament, consecutive losses to the Atlanta Reign and the Shanghai Dragons ended their playoff run.

In the offseason preceding the 2022 season the Gladiators parted ways with head coach Dpei, as well as several players, including Moth and Birdring. The team brought on Sam "face" Merewether, who was a former assistant coach to Dpei, as their new head coach. Additionally, they signed support Daniel "FunnyAstro" Hathaway and damage duo Lee "ANS" Seon-chan and Patiphan "Patiphan" Chaiwong. The Gladiators won the Western region Kickoff Clash, the first tournament of the season, after they defeated the Dallas Fuel in the finals by a score of 4–0. On July 23, the team won the season's first global tournament, the Midseason Madness, after defeating the San Francisco Shock in the finals, 4–2.

Team identity 
On November 2, 2017, the Los Angeles Gladiators brand was officially unveiled. The name and logo, a roaring lion head in a battle-hardened shield, were selected in spirit of the original superstars of sports and entertainment (as well as the Los Angeles Memorial Coliseum), the gladiators of ancient Rome, whose ferocity and "willingness to make the ultimate sacrifice captured the hearts of millions of people of all backgrounds for centuries". Continuing with the gladiator theme, the team colors were announced as purple and white, inspired from the royal colors of the Roman emperors that the gladiators fought for. In addition, the written logo was revealed with a contrasting color used intentionally for the connected letters L and A in "Gladiators", to highlight the Los Angeles location of the team.

As an addition to their branding, the Gladiators began using the slogan "shields up" on social media, possibly a reference to the frequent use of shields by the ancient Roman gladiators as a means of defense.  As a result, fans of the team have often chanted "Shields up" during the team's matches.  When asked what the slogan meant to him in an interview, head coach David "Dpei" Pei stated, "It's kind of like defending your team, like being there for your team … I think that's what kind of epitomizes the Gladiators' saying 'shields up.'"

Zayde Wølf's song "Gladiator" was used by the team during their last entrance of the 2018 playoffs.  The song became popular with the team's fans, and since then it has been used by the team for almost every single one of their entrances at the arena.

Personnel

Current roster

Head coaches

Awards and records

Seasons overview

Individual accomplishments 
Role Star selections
kevster (Kevin Persson) – 2021
SPACE (Indy Halpern) – 2021
Shu (Kim Jin-seo) – 2021

All-Star Game selections
BigG00se (Benjamin Isohanni) – 2018
Fissure (Baek Chan-hyung) – 2018
Surefour (Lane Roberts) – 2018
Bischu (Aaron Kim) – 2018
Decay (Jang Gui-Un) – 2019
SPACE (Indy Halpern) – 2020
Birdring (Kim Ji-heyok) – 2020

Academy team

On February 15, 2018, the Gladiators formally announced their academy team would go under the name "Gladiators Legion" for Overwatch Contenders North America, as well as revealing their 6-player Season One roster led by head coach Gannon "RaptorZ" Nelson. In December 2019, Gladiators Legion disbanded, after two years of competing in Overwatch Contenders.

Notes

References

External links 

 

 
Overwatch League teams
2017 establishments in California
Esports teams based in Los Angeles
Esports teams established in 2017